Nayakas of Chitradurga (1588–1779 CE) ruled parts of eastern Karnataka during the post-Vijayanagara period. During the rule of Hoysala Empire and Vijayanagara Empire, they served as a feudatory chiefdom. Later after the fall of the Vijayanagara empire, they ruled at times as an independent Chiefdom and at other times as a vassal of the Mysore Kingdom, Mughal Empire and Maratha Empire. Finally their territories merged into the province of Mysore under the British.

Origin
According to historian Barry Lewis, the earliest chieftains of the kingdom were local chiefs (Dandanayakas) of the Bedar caste under the Hoysala empire, during their rule over what is today Karnataka. They later won the attention and appreciation of the Vijayanagar kings through their acts of bravery and were appointed as governors of the region. According to historian Suryanath Kamath, the Chitradurga chiefs under the Vijayanagara empire were originally from the Davangere district in Karnataka. Some Marathi records call them Kala Pyada in admiration for their fighting qualities.

The Chitradurga Fort was their stronghold and the very heart of the province.

The Nayaka clan

Timmanna Nayaka (1568–1589) of Matti: A chieftain from Matti in Davangere taluk during the rule of Saluva Narasimha.
He ruled areas covering Davangere district and Chitradurga district.

Obanna Nayaka I (1588–1602) is also known as Madakari Nayaka I.

Kasturi Rangappa Nayaka I (1602–1652) In 1602, Obanna Nayaka was succeeded by his son Kasturi Rangappa Nayaka. He was a brave soldier who defeated sultan's of Bijapur. His reign was full of conflicts with neighbouring chiefs. Several battles were fought with the Paleyagar (chief) of Basavapattana over territories such as Mayakonda, Santebennur, Holalkere, Anaji, and Jagalur, all of which ultimately became part of the Chitradurga territory.  At the time of his death in 1652, the kingdoms possessions yielded a revenue of 65,000 Durgi Pagodas.

Madakari Nayaka II (1652–1674) Rangappa Nayaka was succeeded by his son Madakari Nayaka II in 1652 who is credited with a number of military successes, particularly in the regions east of Chitradurga.　He killed Shah Adib Allah in 1671 in a battle at Chitradurga.

Obanna Nayaka II (1674–1675) His rule saw civil unrest. He was killed by his own men.

Shoora Kantha Nayaka (1675–1676) His rule saw civil unrest. He was killed by his own men.

Chikkanna Nayaka (1676–1686)

Madakari Nayaka III (1686–1688)

Donne Rangappa Nayaka (1688–1689)

Bharamanna Nayaka of Bilichodu (1689–1721) known as the last of the great Nayakas of Chitradurga, he became a Maratha ally and fought in the battle of Dodderi in 1695 but had to pay tribute later to the Mughals for supporting the Marathas. He fought many pitched battles against the Mughals, and is credited for building many temples including the Ranganatha Swamy at Niratadi, and irrigation tanks.  He was also known as "Bichchugatti Bahramanna Nayaka"

Madakari Nayaka IV (1721–1748) was a Maratha feudatory. He was killed during continued hostilities against the Nayakas of Davangere.

Kasturi Rangappa Nayaka II (1748–1758), son of Kasturi Rangappa Nayaka II, retook Mayakonda territory. He achieved this with the help of the Maratha Sardar Murari Rao and the Subedar of Advani. Kasturi Rangappa Nayaka is said to have made various expeditions to the north and south, and in the latter direction gained some possessions in the Budihal region. He is also said to have maintained close ties with the Subedar of Sira. He died in 1754 without an heir. Madakeri Nayaka the last, son of one Bharamappa Nayaka of Janakal-Durga, became his successor.

Madakari Nayaka (1758–1779) was a brave soldier and a shrewd administrator as well (also called as Madakari Nayaka V). He allied himself with Haider Ali of the Mysore Kingdom at times and at other times with the Marathas. It was during his time that Haider Ali attacked the Chitradurga Fort leading to the heroics of "Onake Obavva". Later having been betrayed by the Marathas and some local officers, Madakari Nayaka was defeated by Hyder Ali, taken prisoner and killed. The Chitradurga Nayakas form an integral part of Kannada folklore.

Notes

References
History of Nayakas of Chitradurga, Barry Lewis, Dept of Anthropology, University of Illinois
Dr. Suryanath U. Kamath, A Concise history of Karnataka from pre-historic times to the present, Jupiter books, MCC, Bangalore, 2001 (Reprinted 2002)

1674 establishments in India
1818 disestablishments in India
Dynasties of India
Empires and kingdoms of India
Former confederations
Former countries in South Asia
Historical Hindu empires
Maharashtra
States and territories established in 1674
History of Karnataka